Slings & Arrows is a Canadian television series set at the fictional New Burbage Festival, a Shakespearean festival similar to the real-world Stratford Festival. It stars Paul Gross, Stephen Ouimette and Martha Burns. Rachel McAdams appeared in the first season.

The darkly comic series first aired on Canada's Movie Central and The Movie Network channels in 2003, and received acclaim in the United States when it was shown on the Sundance Channel two years later. Three six-episode seasons were filmed, with the final season airing in Canada in the summer of 2006 and in the United States in early 2007.

Slings & Arrows was created and written by former Kids in the Hall member Mark McKinney, playwright and actress Susan Coyne, and comedian Bob Martin. All three appear in it as well. The entire series was directed by Peter Wellington.

Plot
Slings & Arrows centers around life at a fictional Shakespearean theatre festival in New Burbage, Canada. Each season focuses on The New Burbage Festival’s production of a different play. The themes of the play are often juxtaposed with personal and professional conflicts facing the festival’s cast and crew.

Season 1: Hamlet
The show's central characters are actor/director Geoffrey Tennant (Paul Gross), New Burbage artistic director Oliver Welles (Stephen Ouimette), and actress Ellen Fanshaw (Martha Burns), who seven years previously collaborated on a legendary production of Hamlet. Midway through one of the performances, Geoffrey suffered a nervous breakdown, jumped into Ophelia's grave and then ran screaming from the theater. After that, he was committed to a psychiatric institution.

When the series begins, Geoffrey is in Toronto, running a small company, "Théâtre Sans Argent" (French for "Theatre Without Money"), on the verge of being evicted. Oliver and Ellen have stayed at New Burbage, where Oliver has gradually been commercializing his productions and the festival. On the opening night of the New Burbage's A Midsummer Night's Dream, Oliver sees Geoffrey on the news, chained to his theatre in protest. Heavily drunk, Oliver calls Geoffrey from a payphone and they argue about the past. Oliver then passes out in the street and is run over and killed by a truck bearing the slogan "Canada's Best Hams".

Geoffrey's blistering eulogy at Oliver's funeral about the state of the festival leads to him being asked to take over Oliver's job on a temporary basis. After clashing with an old rival, Darren Nichols (Don McKellar), Geoffrey is reluctantly forced to take over directing the festival's latest production of Hamlet. Making this difficult are Jack Crew (Luke Kirby), the insecure American film star cast as Hamlet; Geoffrey's former lover Ellen, who is playing Gertrude and dating a much younger man; and Oliver, now haunting both Geoffrey and the festival as a ghost. Also in the play is apprentice actress Kate (Rachel McAdams), who finds herself falling for Jack.

On the business side of the festival, New Burbage manager Richard Smith-Jones (Mark McKinney) is seduced by one of his sponsors, American executive Holly Day (Jennifer Irwin) who wants to remake New Burbage into a shallow, commercialized "Shakespeareville".

Season 2: Macbeth
The second season follows the New Burbage production of Macbeth.

Richard is desperate for money to keep the company going, and Geoffrey, frustrated over what he sees as a lack of commitment from his actors, suggests downsizing the company. A new actor, Henry Breedlove (Geraint Wyn Davies), arrives to star in a production of Macbeth, which Geoffrey is reluctant to direct because of its supposed difficulty (though he doesn't believe in the curse of "The Scottish Play").

Richard finds funding in the form of a government grant that comes with a catch—it may be used only for "rebranding". So, Richard hires an avant-garde advertising agency, Froghammer, to promote and rebrand the festival. Sanjay (Colm Feore), the head of Froghammer, launches a series of shock advertisements and manipulates Richard into accepting them.

Elsewhere at the festival, Darren has returned from an artistic rebirth in Germany to direct a version of Romeo and Juliet in which the actors don't touch or even look at each other, much to the chagrin of the couple playing the lead roles. The festival's administrator, Anna Conroy (Susan Coyne), copes with an influx of interns and begins a romance with playwright Lionel Train (Jonathan Crombie) who is doing a reading at the festival.

Ellen undergoes a tax audit, in preparation for which she is able to explain the "business purpose" of such theatrical necessities as lipstick and a push-up bra.

Meanwhile, Geoffrey obsesses over directing Macbeth, antagonizes his cast and crew, and starts seeing Oliver's ghost again, all of which make Ellen fear for his sanity.

Season 3: King Lear
The third season follows the New Burbage production of King Lear.

The cast of Macbeth returns home after a successful run of the production on Broadway, where an old friend of Ellen's (Janet Bailey) tells her to think about moving beyond New Burbage. As Richard tries to cope with being a success, Anna must deal with a group of stranded musicians and Darren is back in town, this time to direct a new musical, East Hastings.

Geoffrey, meanwhile, has cast an aging theatre legend, Charles Kingman (William Hutt) as Lear, despite everyone's fears that the role will kill him. As rehearsals continue, Charles terrorizes Sophie (Sarah Polley), the actress playing Cordelia. Sophie is also involved in the rivalry between the young actors in Lear and the young actors in the musical, whose success soon overshadows the troubled Shakespeare production.

As things spiral out of control, Oliver returns to haunt and help, and Geoffrey seeks therapy from an unlikely source.

Episodes

Season 1 (2003)

Season 2 (2005)

Season 3 (2006)

Background and production

Development and writing
In the late 1990s, Tecca Crosby pitched the idea of a half-hour comedy about a theatre festival to producer Niv Fichman. Fichman recruited Susan Coyne to write the pilot, which at the time was called Over The Top. Mark McKinney later joined the project, followed by Bob Martin. Coyne, McKinney, and Martin are listed as the show’s creators, and share writing credits on all 18 episodes.

The series was produced by Rhombus Media for The Movie Network and Showcase.

Filming
Filming took place in southern Ontario, Canada. The lobby of the fictional Swan Theatre is Toronto’s Ed Mirvish Theatre. Interior theatre scenes were filmed in Hamilton’s Tivoli Theatre in season one and in Brantford’s Sanderson Centre in seasons two and three. The Studio Theatre where season three's East Hastings performs is the main stage of Theatre Passe Muraille in Toronto.  Other locations included the Blue Goose Tavern in Toronto, and Yong’s Restaurant in Georgetown.

Remake
In 2009, a remake of Slings & Arrows, titled Som & Furia (“Sound & Fury”), aired on Brazil’s Rede Globo network. The 12-part Portuguese-language miniseries was produced and co-directed by Fernando Meirelles.

Possible prequel
As of November 2019, the creators were shopping a prequel to Slings & Arrows called The Amateurs about the origins of The New Burbage Festival in the 1950s.

Reception

Awards and nominations
In its three seasons, Slings & Arrows was nominated for 50 awards across several categories, and won 22 awards for acting, writing, direction, editing and more.

It won 13 Gemini Awards. It was nominated for Best Dramatic Series every season it aired, and won twice. It won at least two Gemini awards for acting in every season, winning three in each of 2006 and 2007.

In addition to the Gemini Awards, the series swept Best Drama (One Hour) from the Writers Guild of Canada all three times it was nominated, and won Outstanding Television Series – Drama Awards from the Directors Guild of Canada in 2006 and 2007. The Writers Guild of Canada nominated three of its episodes for Best Drama Series in 2004.

Other awards included a Canadian Comedy Award in 2005 for Television – Pretty Funny Writing – Series, and a Satellite Award in 2006 for Best DVD Release of a TV Show.

This table summarizes award wins by cast members:

Many cast members—guests as well as regulars—were Gemini-nominated for their work on Slings & Arrows but did not win, including Jennifer Irwin, Sarah Polley, Chris Leavins, Don McKellar and William Hutt.

References

External links 

Shakespearean Struggles, Both Onstage and Backstage  at New York Times.com, August 5, 2005
Sex and Shakespeare  - Writers Guild of Canada article and interview at www.wgc.ca, Summer 2005
Bob Martin - Downstage Center interview at American Theatre Wing.org, June 2006
Slings & Arrows - NPR Weekend Edition interview at NPR.org, July 21, 2007

2000s Canadian comedy-drama television series
2003 Canadian television series debuts
2006 Canadian television series endings
Adaptations of works by William Shakespeare
Crave original programming
English-language television shows
Gemini and Canadian Screen Award for Best Drama Series winners
Showcase (Canadian TV channel) original programming
Television series about actors